The Oklahoma Hospital Association (OHA) is the state affiliate of the American Hospital Association. It was established on May 21, 1919, after meeting of representatives from 20 Oklahoma hospitals, electing Dr. Fred S. Clinton as the first president. He served as president for the first nine years of the organization's existence. Today, OHA represents more than 150 hospitals and health care entities, such as nursing homes, home health agencies, surgery centers, and medical supply businesses in the U.S. state of Oklahoma.

Objective
OHA's stated objective is to "improve the general welfare of the public by leading and assisting its members to provide better health care services for all people."

Services
Services include legislative tracking and representation, communications, educational programs, health care industry information and data, and quality and risk management resources.  In conjunction with other organizations OHA has worked on workforce shortage initiatives.

See also
 American Hospital Association
 List of hospitals in Oklahoma

References

External links
 Oklahoma Hospital Association homepage

Oklahoma Hospital Association
Oklahoma Hospital Association
Organizations established in 1919
1919 establishments in Oklahoma